Larke is a surname. Notable people with the name include:

Alex Larke (born 1979), British singer
Glenda Larke, Australian writer
Joan Larke (c.1490–1532), English mistress
John Larke (c.1500–1544), English priest
John Short Larke (1840–1910), Canadian trade commissioner
Thomas Larke, English priest

See also
Larke, Pennsylvania
Lark (name)